Antonio Santoro (born 13 September 1989 in Potenza) is an Italian cyclist, who most recently rode for UCI Continental team .

Major results

2007
 6th Overall Giro di Basilicata
1st Stage 2
 8th Overall Giro della Lunigiana
2009
 4th Trofeo Gianfranco Bianchin
 4th Gran Premio Palio del Recioto
 6th Trofeo Banca Popolare di Vicenza
2010
 3rd Overall Girobio
 6th Gran Premio San Giuseppe
 6th Giro delle Valli Aretine
 8th Trofeo Città di Brescia
2011
 4th Circuito de Getxo
 7th Overall Settimana Ciclistica Lombarda
 9th Trofeo Melinda
2013
 9th Overall Troféu Joaquim Agostinho
2014
 1st  Mountains classification Okolo Slovenska
 5th Grand Prix Südkärnten
2015
 8th Overall Szlakiem Grodów Piastowskich
 10th Overall Giro della Regione Friuli Venezia Giulia
 10th Trofeo Internazionale Bastianelli
 10th Giro del Medio Brenta
2016
 6th Overall Tour of Bihor
 6th Giro dell'Appennino
2017
5th Overall Tour of Qinghai Lake
 5th Overall Tour de Taiwan
 7th Overall Flèche du Sud
2018
 4th Overall Tour of Qinghai Lake
 5th Overall Sibiu Cycling Tour

References

External links

1989 births
Living people
Italian male cyclists
People from Potenza
Cyclists from Basilicata
Sportspeople from the Province of Potenza